Children of Gebelawi is a novel by the Egyptian writer and Nobel laureate Naguib Mahfouz. It is also known by its Egyptian dialectal transliteration, Awlad Haretna, and by the alternative translated transliteral Arabic title of Children of Our Alley.

Controversy
It was originally published in Arabic in 1959, in serialised form, in the daily newspaper Al-Ahram. It was met with severe opposition from religious authorities, and was only released uncut in its entirety due to the intervention of president Gamal Abdel Nasser, who was a friend of Al-Ahram's editor, Mohammed Heikal. and publication in the form of a book was banned in Egypt.

It was first printed in Lebanon in 1967. An English translation by Philip Stewart was published in 1981 and is no longer in print; the American University of Cairo had controlled the world rights since 1976 and had licensed Heinemann Educational Books to publish Stewart's version, but Heinemann sold back its rights a few weeks before the Nobel Prize.  However, Three Continents Press still had license to publish on the American market, and Stewart wanted to continue publishing quietly in America and to avoid a world-wide relaunch of such a controversial book, but when he refused to sell his copyright, American University of Cairo commissioned a new version by Peter Theroux for Doubleday to launch backdated to 1959.

It was this book that earned Naguib Mahfouz condemnation from Omar Abdel-Rahman in 1989, who called on him to repent or be killed, Abdel-Rahman also claimed that "If this sentence had been passed on Naguib Mahfouz when he wrote Children of the Alley, Salman Rushdie would have realized that he had to stay within bounds". after the Nobel Prize had revived interest in it. As a result, in 1994 – a day after the anniversary of the prize – Mahfouz was attacked and stabbed in the neck by two extremists outside his Cairo home. Mahfouz survived the attack, yet he suffered from its consequences until his death in 2006.

Four months after Mahfouz's death, the book was officially released in Egypt, where it became a best seller.

Synopsis

The story recreates the interlinked history of the three monotheistic Abrahamic religions (Judaism, Christianity, and Islam), allegorised against the setting of an imaginary 19th century Cairene alley.

Critics claimed that Gabalawi stands for God. Mahfouz rejected this, saying that he stood for "a certain idea of God that men have made" and that "Nothing can represent God. God is not like anything else. God is gigantic." The first four sections retell, in succession, the stories of: Adam (Adham أدهم) and how he was favoured by Gabalawi over the latter's other sons, including the eldest Satan/Iblis (Idris إدريس). In subsequent generations the heroes relive the lives of Moses (Gabal جبل), Jesus (Rifa'a رفاعة) and Muhammad (Qasim قاسم). The followers of each hero settle in different parts of the alley, symbolising Judaism, Christianity and Islam. The protagonist of the book's fifth section is Arafa (عرفة), who symbolises modern science and comes after the prophets, while all of their followers claim Arafa as one of their own.

Central to the plot are the futuwwat (strongmen) who control the alley and exact protection money from the people. The successive heroes overthrow the strongmen of their time, but in the next generation new strongmen spring up and things are as bad as ever. Arafa tries to use his knowledge of explosives to destroy the strongmen, but his attempts to discover Gabalawi's secrets leads to the death of the old man (though he does not directly kill him). The Chief Strongman guesses the truth and blackmails Arafa into helping him to become the dictator of the whole Alley. The book ends, after the murder of Arafa, with his friend searching in a rubbish tip for the book in which Arafa wrote his secrets. The people say "Oppression must cease as night yields to day. We shall see the end of tyranny and the dawn of miracles."

Publications

 1981, UK, Heinemann  Pub date 1981, paperback (as Children of Gebelawi - Stewart's translation)
 1988, USA, Three Continents Press  Pub date 13 April 1981, paperback (as Children of Gebelawi - Stewart's translation)
 1990, Israel, Am Oved , Hebrew translation by David Sagiv as Children of our neighborhood בני שכונתנו, end notes by Prof. Sasson Somekh.
 1996, USA, Doubleday , Pub date 1996, hardback (as Children of the Alley -Theroux's translation)
 1997, USA, Passeggata Press, Pub date 1997, paperback (as Children of Gebelaawi - Stewart's version revised)

References

1. Children of Gebelaawi, 1997 edition (referenced above), introduction, pp. vii-xxv.

1959 novels
Novels by Naguib Mahfouz
Censorship in Islam
Works originally published in Egyptian newspapers
Novels first published in serial form
Novels set in Cairo